Mayank Chhaya is a journalist and ... based in Chicago. His career includes extensive reporting experience out of India, Pakistan, Sri Lanka and the United States. He is a widely published commentator on South Asian and China-Tibet affairs. Since 1998 he has also been writing extensively about America in the wider international context.

Chhaya is currently involved shooting and editing Gandhi's Song, a feature-length documentary about the life and times of Narsinh Mehta, a 15th-century Indian poet-philosopher whose writings profoundly influenced Mohandas Gandhi. One of Mehta's songs "Vaishnav Jan To" was Gandhi's moral guiding force throughout his life.

Publication 
 Dalai Lama: The Revealing Life Story and His Struggle for Tibet, I.B.Tauris, 2008,

References

External links
 Official website
 Swachcha Bhai, a comedy short film written by Mayank Chhaya

Living people
Writers from Chicago
Year of birth missing (living people)
Journalists from Illinois
Place of birth missing (living people)